Tigray Stadium is a multi-purpose stadium in Mekelle, Ethiopia. The stadium has a capacity of over 60,000 people.

Tigray Stadium was opened to the public in 2017, before the completion of the final phase of construction. As a result, football matches and other public events have been held without adequate seating and roofing. The stadium is home to five football clubs based in the Tigray region, including Mekelle 70 Enderta FC,  Shire Endaselassie F.C., Welwalo Adigrat University F.C.  and Dedebit FC. Notably, the overuse of the stadium's facilities has contributed to construction delays.

References

Multi-purpose stadiums in Ethiopia
Football venues in Ethiopia
Sport in Tigray Region
Mekelle
2017 establishments in Ethiopia
Sports venues completed in 2017
21st-century architecture in Ethiopia